The stripeback hap (Buccochromis nototaenia) is a species of freshwater fish in the, tribe Haplochromini part of the subfamily Pseudocrenilabrinae of the family Cichlidae.

It is endemic to Lake Malawi and Lake Malombe and is found in Malawi, Mozambique, and Tanzania. Some authorities classify Buccochromis atritaeniatus and Buccochromis oculatus as junior synonyms of B. nototaenia but this is not followed by FishBase.

References

Stripeback hap
Fish described in 1902
Taxa named by George Albert Boulenger
Taxonomy articles created by Polbot